Crooked Creek is a stream in Lewis County in the U.S. state of Missouri. It is a tributary of the Wyaconda River.

Crooked Creek was so named on account of its frequent meanders.

See also
List of rivers of Missouri

References

Rivers of Lewis County, Missouri
Rivers of Missouri